Leyton is a London Underground station in Leyton, in the London Borough of Waltham Forest, East London. Located on Leyton High Road, adjacent to the A12, the station is on the Central line between two stations assigned to two fare zones – Stratford and Leytonstone. It is in zone 3.

Location
Leyton Mills Retail Park, Leyton Library, New Spitalfields Market, Leyton Orient F.C. stadium, and St. Patrick's Catholic Cemetery are within proximity of the station. Around Leyton station, the line runs parallel to the A12 road, while the station entrance is connected by the A112. It serves the area of the name itself, situated to the north of the A12 in the London Borough of Waltham Forest. Leyton is largely residential, with houses built from 1870 to 1910. The origin of its name was derived from its geographical location, being at the "tun" of the river Lea, and the ancient parish was named Low Leyton. To the south, it covers the Cathall housing estate in Leytonstone.

History
A station at Leyton was opened on the same day, and was originally named Low Leyton. It was renamed Leyton on 27 November 1867 by the Great Eastern Railway. The current station buildings largely date from the reconstruction of 1879, which saw the original level crossing replaced by a bridge, although some alterations were carried out in connection with the transfer of the station from the London & North Eastern Railway to London Underground as part of the eastern extensions of the Central line.

When the Central line (then known as the Central London Railway) was amalgamated under the management of London Passenger Transport Board in 1933, plans for major expansions to the line were developed. The station was first served by the Central line on 5 May 1947, as part of the extension of the line to Leytonstone.

In the 1990s, the northern ticket office and entrance – dating from 1901 – were removed as part of the controversial M11 extension (now the A12) that was built adjacent to the station. In the mid-2000s, the station was comprehensively refurbished as part of the London Underground PPP.

Planned upgrade and step free access 
According to TfL, the station is severely overcrowded at peak periods, due to the small ticket hall (as a result of the station's location on top of the bridge over the tracks), and the proximity of the ticket barriers to the narrow pavement outside the station. In 2011, it was announced the capacity of the station would be increased, in order to cope with the predicted additional users of the station during the 2012 Olympic Games, and to ease the existing congestion. This work would have created a new access to Goodall Road from the westbound platform. This work never materialised.

In 2019, it was announced that Waltham Forest and Transport for London would fund a £18million expansion and upgrade of the station, including step free access. This work will involve construction of a new, larger ticket hall north of the current one, a new footbridge, wider stairs and step free access to both platforms. The existing ticket hall building would then be repurposed as a retail unit by TFL Property. In 2020, a funding agreement between Waltham Forest and TFL was signed, with works estimated to begin in 2021 – with completion by 2023.

Services and connections

Services
Leyton is between Stratford and Leytonstone stations on the London Underground Central line. The station is registered under Fare Zone 3, and sits between two adjacent stations assigned to two zones. Trains generally operate between West Ruislip and Epping, and between Ealing Broadway and Hainault. The typical off-peak services, in trains per hour (tph) is:
12 tph eastbound to Epping or Loughton
9 tph eastbound to Hainault or Woodford
3 tph eastbound to Newbury Park
12 tph westbound to West Ruislip or Northolt
9 tph westbound to Ealing Broadway
3 tph westbound to White City

Night Tube services also operate at this station. Trains run every 10 minutes to Hainault via Newbury Park or Loughton eastbound, and to Ealing Broadway or White City westbound.

Connections
London Buses routes 58, 69, 97 and 158 serve the station with W14, W15 and night route N26 nearby.

Notes and references

Notes

References

Bibliography
 

Tube stations in the London Borough of Waltham Forest
Former Great Eastern Railway stations
Railway stations in Great Britain opened in 1856
Central line (London Underground) stations
London Underground Night Tube stations
Tube station